Khosrow castle is a historical castle located in Ardabil County in Ardabil Province,

References 

Castles in Iran